John A. "Pop" Norman (May 29, 1883 – April 6, 1956) was a member of the Wisconsin State Assembly.

Biography
Norman was born in Hartford, Wisconsin. He graduated from the University of Wisconsin-Madison in 1907. Norman married Emma Laughran in 1911. His nickname "Pop" derived from his teaching career: he taught at schools in New York, Washington, California, and Wisconsin, including 21 years as a physics teacher at Lincoln High School in Manitowoc before becoming an assemblyman.

Career
Norman was first elected to the Assembly in 1948. He was a Republican.

References

People from Hartford, Wisconsin
University of Wisconsin–Madison alumni
1883 births
1956 deaths
20th-century American politicians
Republican Party members of the Wisconsin State Assembly